Dərəcənnət (also, Dərəcənnətli) is a village and municipality in the Shaki Rayon of Azerbaijan. It has a population of 803.

References

Populated places in Shaki District